BelAmi is a gay pornographic film studio with offices in Bratislava, Prague and Budapest. It was established in 1993 by filmmaker George Duroy,  a Slovak native who took his pseudonym from the protagonist Georges Duroy in Guy de Maupassant's novel Bel Ami. In addition to hardcore DVDs, BelAmi and Bruno Gmünder Verlag also produce calendars and photo books, such as Howard Roffman's Private Moments: Bel Ami (2009), and its performers are frequent headliners at nightclubs and similar venues around Europe, the United States, Australia, Canada, and elsewhere.

BelAmi has employed hundreds of actors over its history.

The studio has won numerous adult entertainment awards and nominations. BelAmi earned five 2010 XBIZ Awards citations, including LGBT studio of the year, and five nominations at the 2010 GayVN Awards, including best newcomer for Kris Evans. They won the award for best marketing—company image. In addition to numerous film accolades, BelAmi also received XBIZ Awards in 2013 and 2014 for Gay Site of the Year, in 2015 for Gay Studio of the Year, and the 2016 XBIZ Award for Adult Site of the Year – Gay. George Duroy, as well as marquee performers Lukas Ridgeston and Johan Paulik, have been inducted into the GayVN Awards Hall of Fame.

Selected films
 Frisky Summer 1,2,3 (1995, 1996, 1998)
 An American in Prague (1997)
 The 101 Men series (1998–2002)
 The Personal Trainers series (2001–present)
 Greek Holiday (2004)
 Lukas in Love (2005)
 The Private Life of Brandon Manilow (2008)
 French Kiss (2008)
 Seriously Sexy (2009)
 5 Americans in Prague (2009)
 Todd and Dolph (2010)
 Skin on Skin (2010)
 Step by Step: The Education of  Porn Star: Kris Evans (2010)
 Step by Step: The Education of a Porn Star: Jean-Daniel Chagall (2010)
 Taboo (2010)
 Bel Ami 3D (2011)
 Kinky Angels 1: Kevin Warhol (2011)
 Kris Evans: Up & Close (2011)
 Irresistible (2012)
 Passion (2012)
 An American in Prague in 3D (2013)
 Fucking Kris Series (2014)

See also

 List of male performers in gay porn films
 List of pornographic film studios#Studios that include male-male and male-TG sex
 List of pornographic magazines#Marketed to gay and bisexual men

Bibliography

References

External links
 Official Website

Gay adult entertainment companies
Gay pornographic film studios
Slovak pornography
Gay male pornography websites
1993 establishments in Slovakia
Companies based in Bratislava